All stars but one can be associated with an IAU (International Astronomical Union) constellation. IAU constellations are areas of the sky. Although there are only 88 IAU constellations, the sky is actually divided into 89 irregularly shaped boxes as the constellation Serpens is split into two separate sections, Serpens Caput (the snake's head) to the west and Serpens Cauda (the snake's tail) to the east.

The only star that does not belong to a constellation is the Sun. The Sun travels through the 13 constellations along the ecliptic, the 12 of the Zodiac and Ophiuchus.

Among the remaining stars, the nearer ones exhibit proper motion, so it is only a matter of time before some of them cross a constellation boundary and switch constellations as a consequence. In 1992, Rho Aquilae became the first star to have its Bayer designation "invalidated" by moving to a neighbouring constellation—it is now a star of the constellation Delphinus.

Lists of stars by constellation
Stars are listed in the appropriate lists for the constellation, as follows:

Constellation
Andromeda
Antlia
Apus
Aquarius
Aquila
Ara
Aries
Auriga
Boötes
Caelum
Camelopardalis
Cancer
Canes Venatici
Canis Major
Canis Minor
Capricornus
Carina 
Cassiopeia
Centaurus
Cepheus
Cetus
Chamaeleon
Circinus
Columba
Coma Berenices
Corona Australis
Corona Borealis
Corvus
Crater
Crux
Cygnus
Delphinus
Dorado
Draco
Equuleus
Eridanus
Fornax
Gemini
Grus
Hercules
Horologium
Hydra
Hydrus
Indus
Lacerta
Leo
Leo Minor
Lepus
Libra
Lupus
Lynx
Lyra
Mensa
Microscopium
Monoceros
Musca
Norma
Octans
Ophiuchus
Orion
Pavo
Pegasus
Perseus
Phoenix
Pictor
Pisces
Piscis Austrinus
Puppis
Pyxis
Reticulum
Sagitta
Sagittarius
Scorpius
Sculptor
Scutum
Serpens
Sextans
Taurus
Telescopium
Triangulum
Triangulum Australe
Tucana
Ursa Major
Ursa Minor
Vela
Virgo
Volans
Vulpecula

Criteria of inclusion
Stars named with a Bayer, Flamsteed, HR, or Draper (not from the supplements) designation.
Stellar extremes or otherwise noteworthy stars.
Notable variable stars (prototypes, rare or otherwise important).
Nearest stars (<20 ly).
Stars with planets.
Notable neutron stars, black holes, and other exotic stellar objects/remnants.
Note that these lists are currently unfinished, and there may be stars missing that satisfy these conditions. If you come across one, please feel free to add it.

See also

 Lists of astronomical objects
 Lists of constellations
 Lists of stars
 Lists of star names
 List of proper names of stars (IAU-accepted names)

References

 The Astronomical Almanac (2000).
 Roy L. Bishop, ed., The Observer's Almanac 1991, The Royal Astronomical Society of Canada.
 Burnham's Celestial Handbook: An Observer's Guide to the Universe Beyond the Solar System, Vols. 1, 2, 3 (Dover Pubns, 1978).
 N. D. Kostjuk, HD-DM-GC-HR-HIP-Bayer-Flamsteed Cross Index (2002) (CDS Catalogue IV/27).

External links
Online Planetarium - The Sky – Free interactive star chart based on location
Alphabetical listing of constellations
  Star Names
 Star Names by constellation
 Stars: Index of Proper Names
 Studies of Occidental Constellations and Star Names to the Classical Period: An Annotated Bibliography
 (Un)Common Star Names

 
Lists of stars

Stars